Port Charlotte is an unincorporated community and census-designated place (CDP) in Charlotte County, Florida, United States. The population was 60,625 at the 2020 census. It is part of the Sarasota-Bradenton-Punta Gorda Combined Statistical Area.

Port Charlotte was named to the "10 Best Places to Retire", in the United States for the year 2012 by U.S. News & World Report.

History

The first people to call the Port Charlotte area home were the nomadic Paleo-Indians as they chased big game such as woolly mammoth southward during the last ice age around 10,000 BC. At the time, Port Charlotte was not a coastal area; the peninsula of Florida was much wider than it is today and much drier. As the ice melted, the sea level rose and Florida assumed the shape and climate it has today and the Paleo-Indians gave way to the Calusa, the "shell people." The Calusa thrived on the southwest Florida coast and numbered over 50,000 when the first Spaniards reached the peninsula in the 16th century. The arrival of the Europeans was devastating to the Calusa, as diseases such as smallpox and measles decimated the population. Eventually the Seminole would arrive from points to the north and establish themselves on the peninsula.

In 1819, Florida was ceded by the Spanish and became a U.S. territory, and in 1845 Florida became the 27th state. For the first 100 years of statehood, the area around Port Charlotte was mostly undeveloped. Maps of the area at the turn of the 20th century show that most of the roads and railroads leading into southwest Florida had bypassed the Port Charlotte area. Aside from some cattle ranches and small farming, the area was mostly uninhabited. This would change when the post-World War II boom opened people's eyes to the possibility of developing land in Florida.

In the 1950s, the now defunct General Development Corporation led by the Mackle brothers decided to take advantage of the Florida land boom and developed land primarily on both of Florida's coastlines. Among the areas they planned and developed was the Port Charlotte area. Ultimately, Port Charlotte became the most populous community in Charlotte County, although like most GDC developments, Port Charlotte remained an unincorporated community.

Port Charlotte was severely impacted by Hurricane Charley on August 13, 2004. The hurricane, predicted to hit Tampa as a Category 2 hurricane, took a last-minute right hand turn and intensified into a Category 4 storm as it made landfall near Charlotte Harbor and caused severe damage in the city of Punta Gorda and in the Port Charlotte area. The storm's  maximum sustained winds destroyed almost half of the homes in the county and caused heavy ecological damage to sensitive wetlands in the area.

Geography and climate

Port Charlotte is located at the north end of the Charlotte Harbor Estuary, northwest of the city of Punta Gorda.

Port Charlotte has a warm humid subtropical climate (Köppen climate classification: Cfa) bordering on  a tropical wet and dry climate (Köppen climate classification: Aw). The summers are long, hot and humid with frequent afternoon thunderstorms. The winters are mild to warm with a pronounced drop in precipitation. Year round, the diurnal temperature change averages around 20 degrees Fahrenheit (11 degrees Celsius).

Murdock
The area of northwestern Port Charlotte where State Road 776 intersects US 41 is also known as Murdock.

Government
Since Port Charlotte is unincorporated, it is governed by the government of Charlotte County. The county is governed by a 5-person county commission. They take turns rotating into the commission chair position every year. County commissioners frequently sit on other regional boards involving other municipalities and counties.

Demographics

As of the census of 2000, there were 46,451 people, 20,453 households, and 13,601 families residing in the CDP. The population density was 2,085.9/sq mi (805.3/km). The racial makeup of the CDP was 89.23% White, 6.53% African American, 0.28% Native American, 1.14% Asian, 0.05% Pacific Islander, 1.18% from other races, and 1.59% from two or more races. Hispanic or Latino of any race were 5.16% of the population.

There were 20,453 households, out of which 20.8% had children under the age of 18 living with them, 53.2% were married couples living together, 10.1% had a female householder with no husband present, and 33.5% were non-families. 28.2% of all households were made up of individuals, and 18.6% had someone living alone who was 65 years of age or older. The average household size was 2.25 and the average family size was 2.71.

In the CDP, the age distribution of the population shows 18.7% under the age of 18, 5.4% from 18 to 24, 21.0% from 25 to 44, 24.2% from 45 to 64, and 30.7% who were 65 years of age or older. The median age was 49 years. For every 100 females, there were 87.7 males. For every 100 females age 18 and over, there were 84.2 males.

According to Sperling's Best Places, as of July 2015 the family median income in Port Charlotte was $48,911, and household income was $40,049. The per capita income was $22,681. Port Charlotte's unemployment rate was 5.50%, compared to 6.30% for the United States overall.

Sports
Port Charlotte was home to the Charlotte Stone Crabs, which is a member of the Florida State League and Class High-A affiliate of the Tampa Bay Rays, which also hold its spring training at Charlotte Sports Park until 2020. The Rays also hold extended spring training in Port Charlotte, and have a Florida Complex League team which began to play in June 2009.

The Port Charlotte Invitational was a golf tournament held in 1969 at the Port Charlotte Golf & Country Club on the LPGA Tour. Kathy Whitworth won the event.

Education

Public schools in Port Charlotte are operated by Charlotte County Public Schools. For the 2007-08 school year, all schools in Port Charlotte received A's from the Florida Department of Education. Port Charlotte High School is the only traditional public high school located in Port Charlotte, although some parts of Port Charlotte are considered part of Charlotte High School's area, and students have the option to attend Charlotte Virtual School, a charter school, a special needs school, or a different traditional public high school through school choice. There are numerous private schools in Port Charlotte, including Family Christian Academy (formerly known as Community Christian School), Charlotte Preparatory School (formerly known as Charlotte Academy), Genesis Christian School, Joyful Noise Learning Center, Port Charlotte Adventist School, Port Charlotte Christian School, and St. Charles Borromeo Catholic School.
Port Charlotte is home to three small higher education facilities, including Charlotte Technical College, Southern Technical College's Port Charlotte campus, and Southwest Florida Bible Institute.

Library 
The Mid-County Regional Library and the Port Charlotte Library are located in Port Charlotte. They are included in the Charlotte County Library System.

History 
 1961 – Port Charlotte Library was established
 1963 – The Port Charlotte, Punta Gorda, and Englewood Public Libraries joined and formed the Charlotte County System
 1968 – The Port Charlotte Library moved to the Cultural Center of Charlotte County, the present location
 1985 – The Murdock Library was established as the library system administrative facility
 1996 – The Charlotte County Library System updated circulation with an automated catalog system
 2005 – Murdock Public Library moved to the new Mid-County Regional Library facility

Notable people 
 Vinnie Fiorello, drummer–lyricist of the band Less Than Jake; attended Port Charlotte High School
 John Hall, former kicker for New York Jets and Washington Football Team; born in Port Charlotte and attended Port Charlotte High School
 Vincent Hancock, Olympic gold medalist skeet shooter at 2008 Summer Olympics; born in Port Charlotte
 Anthony Hargrove, defensive end in NFL; attended Port Charlotte High School
 David Holmberg, pitcher for Chicago White Sox; born in Port Charlotte and attended Port Charlotte High School
 Matt LaPorta, left fielder for Cleveland Indians; born in Port Charlotte and attended Port Charlotte High School
 Asher Levine, Fashion Designer located in NYC ; attended Port Charlotte High School
 Josh Williams, NASCAR driver born in Port Charlotte 1993, now driving in the Xfinity series.

See also

 North Port, Florida

References

1950s establishments in Florida
Census-designated places in Charlotte County, Florida
Unincorporated communities in Charlotte County, Florida
Census-designated places in Florida
Unincorporated communities in Florida
Populated places on Charlotte Harbor